Thomas Glyn Doyle (born 17 October 2001) is an English professional footballer who plays as a midfielder for EFL Championship club Sheffield United, on loan from Premier League club Manchester City

Club career

Early career
Born in Manchester, England, Doyle joined Sandbach United F.C. at the age of four, before joining Manchester City at the age of eight.
Tommy turned down a loan move to Preston North End on deadline day in the autumn of 2020 with the intention of fighting for a place in the first team.

Manchester City
Doyle made his professional debut for Manchester City in a 3–1 EFL Cup win over Southampton on 29 October 2019. On 18 September 2020, he extended his contract until 2025.

Hamburger SV (loan)
On 31 August 2021, Doyle joined 2. Bundesliga club Hamburger SV on loan for the 2021–22 season.

Cardiff City (loan)
On 20 January 2022, Doyle joined EFL Championship side Cardiff City on loan until the end of the season. He scored his first goal for the club on 23 February 2022 in a 2–1 loss to Huddersfield Town.

Sheffield United (loan) 
On 4 July 2022, Doyle joined Championship side Sheffield United on a season-long loan. Doyle scored the match winner for Sheffield against Blackburn Rovers in the quarter-finals of the FA Cup on 19 March 2023, sending the club into the semi-finals of the competition for the first time since 2014.

International career
Doyle was a member of the England under-17 squad that hosted the 2018 UEFA European Under-17 Championship. He scored a penalty in the opening game against Israel. The following fixture saw him score the winning goal against Italy. A metatarsal injury in the final group match against Switzerland ruled him out of the rest of the tournament.

On 13 October 2020, Doyle captained the England U20s on his debut for the age group during a 2–0 victory over Wales at St. George's Park.

On 27 August 2021, Doyle received his first call up for the England U21s. On 7 September 2021, he made his England U21 debut during the 2-0 2023 UEFA European Under-21 Championship qualification win over Kosovo U21s at Stadium MK.

Personal life
Doyle's paternal grandfather Mike Doyle and maternal grandfather Glyn Pardoe, were former professional footballers and long-time teammates at Manchester City.

Career statistics

References

External links
 
 Man City Profile

2001 births
Living people
Footballers from Manchester
English footballers
England youth international footballers
English expatriate footballers
England under-21 international footballers
Manchester City F.C. players
Hamburger SV players
Cardiff City F.C. players
Sheffield United F.C. players
Association football midfielders
Premier League players
2. Bundesliga players
Expatriate footballers in Germany
English expatriate sportspeople in Germany